Hammam Remimi Mosque  is a Tunisian mosque in the Halfaouine hood in the north of the Medina of Tunis.

History 
According to the commemorative plaque at the entrance, it was built in 1781 during the Husainid era.

Etymology
The mosque got its name from a hammam near to it that was founded in 1245 by Mohamed Remimi who came from Almería during the Hafsid era.

Localization
It can be found in the Hammam Remimi Street, between two gates of the medina: Bab Souika and Bab El Khadra.

References 

Mosques in Tunis